Michael Haydn's Symphony No. 24 in A major, Perger 15, Sherman 24, MH 302, was written in Salzburg in 1781.

Scored for 2 flutes, 2 oboes, 2 bassoons, 2 horns, posthorn. and strings, in three movements:

Allegro con brio
Andante cantabile, in D major
Minuet and Trio
Presto

The posthorn gets a solo in the Trio of the Minuet.

Notes

References
 A. Delarte, "A Quick Overview of the Instrumental Music of Michael Haydn" Bob's Poetry Magazine November 2006: 21 PDF
 Charles H. Sherman and T. Donley Thomas, Johann Michael Haydn (1737–1806), a chronological thematic catalogue of his works. Stuyvesant, New York: Pendragon Press (1993)
 C. Sherman, "Johann Michael Haydn" in The Symphony: Salzburg, Part 2 London: Garland Publishing (1982): lxviii

Symphony 24
Compositions in A major
1781 compositions